Genouillé is a commune in the Vienne department in the Nouvelle-Aquitaine region in western France. Its population has been declining from its peak of 1495 in 1886 to its current level of 504 (2018).

Gallery

See also
Communes of the Vienne department

References

Communes of Vienne